Amphidromus naggsi is a species of large-sized air-breathing tree snail, an arboreal gastropod mollusk in the family Camaenidae.

Habitat 
Ground dwellers, living among litter around trees.

Distribution 
The type locality of this species is Lâm Đồng Province, Vietnam.

Etymology 
This species is named after Prof. Fred Naggs from U.K.

References 

naggsi
Gastropods described in 2014